Ernst Fiala may refer to:
 Ernst Fiala (footballer)
 Ernst Fiala (automotive engineer)